Mimi Barthélémy, the nom de plume of Michèle Armand (May 3, 1939 – April 27, 2013), was a Haitian writer, actor, storyteller and director.

Life 
She was born in Port-au-Prince and was educated in Haiti and continued her studies at the Institute of Political Studies, at Paris X (Masters in Spanish literature) and at Paris VIII (Doctorate in Theatre and Cinematography Studies) in France. Barthélémy has also lived in Latin America, Sri Lanka and North Africa.

In 1987, she was the host for a series of well-known storytellers at "Le Petit Contoire" in Paris.

In 1989, she received the Becker d’Or from the 3rd Festival d’Acteurs d’Evry for La reine des poissons. In 1992, Barthélémy was awarded the  de l'universalité de la langue française for La Dernière lettre de l'amiral. In 2000, she was named a Chevalier in the French National Order of Merit and, in 2001, an Officier in the Ordre des Arts et des Lettres. In 2011, she was named a Chevalier in the French Legion of Honour.

Barthélémy died in Paris of a heart attack at the age of 73.

Selected works

Stories 
 Haïti, la perle nue (1999)
 La création de l’île de la Tortue (2005)
 Contes d’Haïti (2011)

Theatre 
 L'autre rive lointaine Honduras (1981)
 Sebastian goes shopping Santa Cruz, California (1983)
 Madea Paris (1985)
 La Cocarde d'Ebène Montpellier (1989)
 Soldats-marrons Ris-Orangis (1989)
 Une Très belle mort Avignon (2000)

Recordings 
 La Reine des poissons (2010)
 Contes d’Haïti
 Dis-moi des Chansons d’Haïti (2007)
 Vieux Caïman – Contes de grandes îles de la mer Caraïbe (2001)
 Tendez chanter l’amour (1999)
 Chantez dansez Haïti Guadeloupe (1996)
 Chansons et comptines d’Haïti (1992)
 L’Oranger magique, contes d’Haïti (1992)
 Légendes du monde entier (1992)

References

External links 
 

1939 births
2013 deaths
Haitian women dramatists and playwrights
Haitian women short story writers
Haitian short story writers
Knights of the Ordre national du Mérite
Officiers of the Ordre des Arts et des Lettres
Chevaliers of the Légion d'honneur
People from Port-au-Prince
20th-century Haitian dramatists and playwrights
21st-century Haitian dramatists and playwrights
20th-century Haitian women writers
21st-century Haitian women writers